FEGIME, or Fédération Européenne des Grossistes Indépendants en Matériel Electrique (European Federation of Independent Electrical Wholesalers) is today an international group - comprising 19 National Organisations and more than 260 independent electrical wholesalers in 28 countries in Europe, South America and the Middle East. 

The FEGIME Group acts as an international business generator. Its objective is to unite the strength of our medium-sized, family-owned companies and generate value – for the benefit of our members, customers and suppliers alike. The focus of the cooperation is the support and expansion of our international network, strategic cooperation with manufacturers, increased implementation of central digital activities, the training of next generation leaders and the support of major international customers.

External links
 Fegime international homepage
European trade associations